Petar Ćirković (born 19 November 1999) is a Serbian footballer who plays as a defender for Radnički Niš.

Club career
Petar passed Kosanica youth categories, and also spent three years in Radnički youth categories. On 14 February 2018, Ćirković signed a five-year deal with Radnički Niš. His official debut for Radnički Niš in 23 fixture match of the 2017–18 Serbian SuperLiga season against Bačka, played on 18 February 2018, replacing Siniša Babić in 89 minutes.

Career statistics

Club

References

External links
 

1999 births
Living people
People from Kuršumlija
Association football defenders
Serbian footballers
FK Radnički Niš players
FK Radnički Pirot players
Serbian SuperLiga players
Serbian First League players